Conway may refer to:

Places

United States 
 Conway, Arkansas
 Conway County, Arkansas
 Lake Conway, Arkansas
 Conway, Florida
 Conway, Iowa
 Conway, Kansas
 Conway, Louisiana
 Conway, Massachusetts
 Conway, Michigan
 Conway Township, Michigan
 Conway, Missouri
 Conway, New Hampshire, a New England town
 Conway (CDP), New Hampshire, village in the town
 Conway, North Dakota
 Conway, North Carolina
 Conway, Pennsylvania
 Conway, South Carolina
 Conway River (Virginia)
 Conway, Washington

Elsewhere 
 Conway, Queensland, a locality in the Whitsunday Region, Queensland, Australia
 Conway River (New Zealand)
 Conway, Wales, now spelt Conwy, a town with a castle in North Wales
 River Conway, Wales, similarly respelt River Conwy

Ships 
 HMS Conway (school ship)
 HMS Conway (1832), a 26-gun sixth rate launched in 1832
 USS Conway (DD-70) or USS Craven (DD-70), a Caldwell class destroyer launched in 1918
 USS Conway (DD-507), a Fletcher-class destroyer launched in 1942

Other uses 
 Conway (given name)
 Conway (surname)
 Conway Cabal, a 1777–78 conspiracy
 Conway Publishing
 Conway Recording Studios, California
 Rolls-Royce Conway, the first turbofan aircraft engine to enter service
 Conway, a retail chain operated by National Stores
 FV 4004 Conway, a variant of the Centurion tank
Conway's Game of Life, a two-dimensional cellular automaton
 John Horton Conway, creator of Conway's Game of Life
 Conway the Machine, American rapper

See also 
 Conway High School (disambiguation)
 Conway National Park, Australia
 Conway Reef, an outlying coral reef in Fiji
 Conway Hall, the London home since 1929 of the Conway Hall Ethical Society, the oldest surviving free-thought association in Britain
 Conway Scenic Railroad, a heritage railroad in New Hampshire
 Conway Summit, a mountain pass in California
 Conway Lake, New Hampshire
 Conwy (disambiguation)
 Con-way, a freight transportation and logistics company based in Ann Arbor, MI (formerly based in California)
 Conway's Game of Life
 Conway's Law
 Cornway College, commonly misspelt as Conway, in Mt Hampden, Zimbabwe.
 Conway School of Nursing, the nursing school at Catholic University, Washington D.C., USA.
 Conaway (disambiguation)
 Devon Conway, a South Africa-born cricketer who plays for New Zealand